Roger Thomas may refer to:

Roger Thomas (footballer)
Roger Thomas (American football coach) (born 1947), American football coach
Roger Thomas (British politician) (1925–1994), British Labour Party politician
Roger Thomas (Iowa politician) (born 1950), Iowa State Representative
Roger C. Thomas (born 1939), British physiologist
Roger Thomas (diplomat), former British Ambassador to Azerbaijan
Roger Thomas (designer) (born 1951), interior designer known for his work on Las Vegas casinos
Roger J. Thomas (1942–2015), solar physicist
Roger "Raj" Thomas, fictional character on the U.S. TV series What's Happening!! and What's Happening Now!!